Siege of Deventer may refer to:
Siege of Deventer (1123), conflict between Henry V, Holy Roman Emperor and Lotharius of Supplinburg, duke of Saxony
Siege of Deventer (1179), conflict between Gerard III, Count of Guelders and Baldwin II of Holland, bishop of Utrecht
Siege of Deventer (1456), by Philip of Burgundy
Siege of Deventer (1578), by George van Lalaing, better known as the count of Rennenberg (successful)
Siege of Deventer (1591), Prince Maurice took the city from the Spanish
Siege of Deventer (1814), the French occupied the city after defeating the Cossacks